This is a list of earthquakes in Tanzania:

Earthquakes

References 

Sources

Earthquakes in Tanzania
Tanzania
Earthquakes